The Parker–Hulme murder case began in the city of Christchurch, South Island, New Zealand, on 22 June 1954, when Honorah Rieper (also known as Honorah Parker, her legal name) was killed by her teenage daughter, Pauline Parker, and Pauline's close friend, Juliet Hulme (later known as Anne Perry). Parker was 16 at the time, while Hulme was 15. 

The murder has inspired plays, novels, non-fiction books, and films including Peter Jackson's 1994 film Heavenly Creatures and the French drama Don't Deliver Us from Evil.

Background
Pauline Yvonne Parker (aka  Pauline Rieper) was born on 26 May 1938. She met Juliet Hulme, who was born in London, when they were both in their early teens. Parker came from a working-class background. Her parents were part-time house staff and gardeners, employed by the University. Her father, Herbert Rieper, and her mother, Honorah Parker, were living together but were not actually married (this was not public knowledge and was only revealed later, at the trial). Juliet Hulme, who immigrated to New Zealand with her parents in 1948, was the daughter of Henry Hulme, a physicist who was the rector of University of Canterbury in Christchurch. They both attended Christchurch Girls' High School, then located in what became the Cranmer Centre. Both girls had debilitating illnesses as children – Parker osteomyelitis and Hulme tuberculosis – and they initially bonded over it. According to Parker's accounts, she and Hulme both romanticized the idea of being sick. 

As their friendship developed, Parker and Hulme formed an elaborate fantasy life together. They wrote plays, books, and stories centred in this world. The girls became nearly obsessed with one another, to the point that Parker's parents became concerned that the girls were engaged in a sexual relationship; homosexuality at the time was considered a serious mental illness. The Hulmes also had concerns, but both families continued to allow the girls to see one another, and Parker was accepted at the Hulme home in Ilam for overnights and vacations. The Hulmes were living in Ilam Homestead, a university building. Hulme became withdrawn and ill when Parker would leave her home without her. 

During their relationship, the girls invented their own personal religion, with their own ideas on morality. They rejected Christianity and worshipped their own saints, envisioning a parallel dimension called The Fourth World, essentially their version of Heaven. The Fourth World was a place that they felt they were already able to enter occasionally, during moments of spiritual enlightenment. By Parker's account, they had achieved this spiritual enlightenment because of their friendship.

Parker was not invited to go to Ilam over the summer holidays in 1953 as she had been in previous years. In 1954, Hulme's parents separated. Problems with faculty and the board forced Hulme’s father to resign from his position as rector of the university, and her mother was involved in an extramarital affair. Hulme's family planned to return to England, but it was decided that Hulme herself would be sent to live with relatives in South Africa—ostensibly for her health. 

Both girls were heartbroken over their upcoming separation and decided that Parker should go to South Africa as well. They thought the Hulmes would agree to this plan, though in fact they were unlikely to allow it. Parker was certain her mother would not allow her to go with Hulme. The girls then formed a plan to murder Parker's mother in order to remove the one perceived obstacle of remaining together. Their long term plan was to go to South Africa and then head to Hollywood or New York City, where they believed they would publish their writing and work in film.

Murder
On the afternoon of 22 June 1954, Parker and Hulme had gone for a walk with Parker's mother, Honorah Rieper, through Victoria Park in Christchurch. Approximately  down the path, in a wooded area of the park near a small wooden bridge, Hulme and Parker bludgeoned Rieper to death with half of a brick enclosed in an old stocking. After committing the murder, which they had planned together, the two girls, covered in blood, fled back to the tea kiosk where the three of them had eaten only minutes before. They were met by Agnes and Kenneth Ritchie, owners of the tea shop, whom they told that Rieper had fallen and hit her head. 

Rieper's body was discovered in Victoria Park by Ritchie. Major lacerations were found about her head, neck, and face, with minor injuries to her fingers. Police soon discovered the murder weapon in the nearby woods. The girls' story of Rieper's accidental death quickly fell apart.

Trial and conviction
Prior to the trial, Parker had been known as Pauline Rieper. Her mother had been living with her father, Herbert Rieper, but the police investigations revealed that they were not, in fact, married. Thus, during the trial, both Honorah and Pauline were referred to with the surname "Parker".

The trial was a sensational affair, with speculation about the girls' possible lesbianism and insanity. Parker and Hulme were convicted on 28 August 1954; and, as they were too young to be considered for the death penalty, each spent five years in prison. Some sources say they were released on condition that they never contact each other again, but Sam Barnett, then Secretary for Justice, told journalists there was no such condition. Hulme's release was unconditional, and she immediately rejoined her father in Italy, while Parker was placed on six months' parole in New Zealand, after which she left the country.

Less than four months later, the murder was taken as strong evidence of moral decline by the Special Committee on Moral Delinquency in Children and Adolescents in what became known as the Mazengarb Report, named after its chair, Ossie Mazengarb.

Release
Following her release from prison, Parker was given a new identity as Hilary Nathan, and spent some time in New Zealand under close surveillance before being allowed to leave for England. From at least 1992, she was living in the small village of Hoo, near Strood, Kent, and running a children's riding school. As an adult, she became a devout Roman Catholic. While she has never spoken to the press, in a 1996 statement released through her sister she expressed strong remorse for having killed her mother. Her sister further stated that "[Pauline] committed the most terrible crime and has spent 40 years repaying it by keeping away from people and doing her own little thing ... After it happened, she was very sorry about it. It took her about five years to realise what she had done."

After her release from prison, Hulme spent time in England and the United States, later settling in England and becoming a successful historical detective novelist under her new name, Anne Perry. She has been a member of the Church of Jesus Christ of Latter-day Saints since about 1968. Until 1994, it was not well-known that Perry was Hulme. In March 2006, Hulme/Perry stated that, while her relationship with Parker was obsessive, they were not lesbians.

Media portrayals
The story of the murder was adapted into the 1971 French film Mais ne nous délivrez pas du mal (Don't Deliver Us From Evil) and into Peter Jackson's film Heavenly Creatures (1994). Perry's identity was revealed publicly a few months after the latter film's release. The case was also fictionalised in 1958 as The Evil Friendship by M. E. Kerr under the pseudonym Vin Packer.

Beryl Bainbridge's first novel, Harriet Said..., was inspired by newspaper reports of the case.

Inspired by the case, Angela Carter wrote an unproduced screenplay called The Christchurch Murder in which Parker was renamed Lena Ball and Hulme, Nerissa Locke. Carter's screenplay was influenced by Heavenly Creatures and was later produced as a play for radio, airing on BBC Radio 4 in September 2018.

Mary Orr and Reginald Denham's 1967 play Minor Murder, Michelanne Forster's 1992 New Zealand play Daughters of Heaven and Canadian Trevor Schmidt's 2010 play Folie à Deux were based on the Parker–Hulme murder.

The case also inspired Evie Wyld's novel All The Birds, Singing.

As of 2011, Alexander Roman has completed a documentary called Reflections of the Past, in which Pauline Parker is played by Alice Drewitt. It premiered at Lincoln University (in lieu of Rialto Cinema, which was closed due to the February 2011 Christchurch earthquake) on 9 May.

Micah Nemerever's debut novel, These Violent Delights, is partially inspired by these events. The two main characters' "emotional dynamic" is very similar to that of Parker and Perry, and are even named "Paul" and "Julian" after Pauline and Juliet respectively.

See also 
 Matricide
 Parricide
 Slender Man stabbing

References

Bibliography 
J.H.H. Gaute and Robin Odell, The New Murderers' Who's Who, 1996, Harrap Books, London
Famous Criminal Cases, Volume Two, 1955, London
Hallmark of Horror, 1973, London
Obsession, 1958, London
More Criminal Files, 1957, London
Patrick Wilson, Children who kill, 1973, London
Glamuzina, Julie and Alison J. Laurie, 1991 Parker and Hulme, a lesbian view. Auckland, New Women's Press. Re-published 1995, Ithaca, Firebrand Books. With an introduction by B. Ruby Rich.
Peter Graham, Anne Perry and the murder of the century , 2011

External links
Information on the Parker-Hulme case – from the public library of Christchurch, New Zealand
Lesbian perspective on the Parker-Hulme case – audio and transcript from PrideNZ.com
Daily Record article from September 2012
heavenly-creatures.com – has an extensive section on the Parker-Hulme case.

1954 in New Zealand law
Murder committed by minors
Murder in New Zealand
People from Christchurch
New Zealand female murderers
People educated at Christchurch Girls' High School
Matricides
Female murder victims
1954 murders in New Zealand
Crime in Christchurch
1950s in Christchurch